Jayaco River (Spanish: Río Jayaco) is a  long river in the Dominican Republic province of Monseñor Nouel. A part of the Yuna River watershed, the river originates in Hoyo Redonda within the Cordillera Central mountain range.
The river flows east from its source and reaches its mouth at the Rincón Reservoir (Spanish: Presa de Rincón), a part of the Jima River.

References

Rivers of the Dominican Republic
Geography of Monseñor Nouel Province